Toyoko is a village in Burkina Faso.
 
Toyoko may also refer to:

 Tōkyū Tōyoko Line, a train line operated by Tōkyū which connects the two cities
 Toyoko Inn, a business hotel chain in Japan

People with the given name 
 Toyoko Iwahara (born 1945), Japanese Olympic volleyball player
, Japanese swimmer
 Toyoko Tokiwa (1928–2019), Japanese photographer
 Toyoko Yamasaki (1924–2013), Japanese author
, Japanese opera singer
, Japanese archer
, Japanese discus thrower
, Japanese composer and music educator

Japanese feminine given names